Streptomyces chitinivorans is a chitinolytic bacterium species from the genus of Streptomyces which has been isolated from lake sediments from a fish dumping yard in Balugaon in India.

See also 
 List of Streptomyces species

References

External links
Type strain of Streptomyces chitinivorans at BacDive -  the Bacterial Diversity Metadatabase

 

chitinivorans
Bacteria described in 2016